Christopher Hughes (born 22 December 1992) is a British television personality and presenter from Gloucestershire, England. In 2017, he appeared on the third series of the ITV2 reality series Love Island.

Early life
Hughes was born on 22 December 1992 in Gloucestershire to Paul, a farmer, and Valerie Hughes. He has one brother, Ben Hughes, as well as four half brothers.

Career
Hughes is signed with Off Limits Entertainment. In 2017, he was announced as one of the contestants for the third series of the ITV2 reality programme Love Island. He reached the finale, finishing in third place. Afterwards, he played football for the Gloucestershire club Bourton Rovers F.C. making 13 appearances, as well turning out for his local cricket side Bourton Vale CC, and for the celebrity Tailenders cricket team against a Test Match Special XI, and was a golf clothing ambassador. He was also a brand ambassador of charity Campaign Against Living Miserably, which led to him releasing his own bottled water brand named L'Eau de Chris through Topman.

As part of Chris & Kem, he charted at number 15 on the UK Singles Chart with the song "Little Bit Leave It". A year later, he starred in a reality series with his then girlfriend Olivia Attwood, Chris and Olivia: Crackin' On. In the same year, he signed on for a game show, You Vs. Chris & Kem. His debut book, My Life Story: You Bantering Me, was also published. In the same year, he was named as the brand ambassador for Coral's Champions Club. In 2019, he starred in the BBC Three documentary Me, My Brother And Our Balls.

From 2019, he has presented live horse racing coverage with ITV Racing.

Personal life
In January 2019, Hughes took a live testicular exam on This Morning, to spread cancer awareness. He also revealed having undergone several testicular operations since discovering a varicocele at age 14. 

In January 2019, he began dating former Little Mix member Jesy Nelson. The couple split up in April 2020.

On 28 January 2020, hours after attending the National Television Awards, Hughes got into an altercation with a photographer outside the InterContinental Hotel near the O2.

He is a supporter of Sunderland A.F.C.

Filmography

References

External links 
 

1992 births
English male models
People from Gloucestershire
British television personalities
Living people
English male singers
English television presenters
English male rappers
Love Island (2015 TV series) contestants